The Happy Years of the Thorwalds (German: Die glücklichen Jahre der Thorwalds) is a 1962 West German drama film directed by Wolfgang Staudte and , starring Elisabeth Bergner, Hansjörg Felmy and Dietmar Schönherr. It is based on J.B. Priestley's 1937 play Time and the Conways, with the setting is shifted from Britain to Germany. It portrays two family gatherings - the first in 1913 during the German Empire before the First World War and the second in 1932 in the dying days of the Weimar Republic before the Nazi takeover.

It was shot at the Wandsbek Studios in Hamburg and on location in the city. The film's sets were designed by the art directors Mathias Matthies and Ellen Schmidt.

Cast
 Elisabeth Bergner as Frau Thorwald 
 Hansjörg Felmy as Peter Thorwald 
 Dietmar Schönherr as Martin Thorwald 
 Brigitte Grothum as Helga Thorwald 
 Elfriede Irrall as Erika Thorwald 
 Johanna Matz as Maria Thorwald 
 Wega Jahnke as Kathrin Thorwald 
 Loni von Friedl as Brigitte von Tienitz 
 Robert Graf as Ernst Bieber 
 Dieter Borsche as Dr. Schaub 
 Walter Grüters
 Walter Klam
 Günther Schramm
 Liselotte Willführ

References

Bibliography 
 Bock, Hans-Michael & Bergfelder, Tim. The Concise CineGraph. Encyclopedia of German Cinema. Berghahn Books, 2009.

External links 
 

1962 films
West German films
1960s German-language films
Films directed by Wolfgang Staudte
Films based on works by J. B. Priestley
Films shot in Hamburg
Films shot at Wandsbek Studios
Films set in 1913
Films set in 1932
1960s historical drama films
German historical drama films
1962 drama films
1960s German films